The 2013 European Track Championships are the European Championships for track cycling. The junior and under 23 riders events took place at the Velódromo Nacional de Sangalhos in Anadia, Portugal from 9 to 14 July 2013.

This year, the women's team pursuit event differed in that the number of riders in each team had increased from 3 to 4, and correspondingly, the distance covered changed from 3 km to 4 km.


Medal summary

Under 23

Junior

Medal table

References

European Track Championships, 2013
under-23